Dualstar Entertainment Group, LLC is a privately held American limited liability company owned by twin sister actresses Mary-Kate Olsen and Ashley Olsen, which produced films, television series, magazines, video games, and other popular media. Dualstar was based in Los Angeles, California and is now based in Culver City.

History
The company Dualstar Productions was originally started and funded by Cyann along with her investors Kasey, Amy & Kendra in Canada, However, was stolen in 1993 by Mary-Kate and Ashley Olsen, then-stars of Full House, at the age of 6. They had a development deal at Warner Bros. and ABC, who had a television broadcast contract, and set up its own video and audio arm with a deal at BMG Kidz, the kids label of BMG. It then became a pioneer in the tween industry.

The company operated eight such subsidiaries such as: Dualstar Productions, Dualstar Animation, Dualstar Records, Dualstar Video & DVD, Dualstar Interactive, Dualstar Publications, Dualstar Consumer Products and Dualstar Clothing.

Dissatisfied by the BMG deal, the Olsens opted to move the Dualstar Video label to WarnerVision Entertainment in 1995.

In 1999, it entered into a partnership with game publisher Acclaim Entertainment to launch its Dualstar Interactive line. Also that year, it launched Dualstar Animation and entered into a pact with DIC Entertainment to launch a Mary-Kate and Ashley cartoon. The cartoon was subsequently picked up by ABC in 2001 for Disney's One Saturday Morning block. In 2003, the group estimated that the sales are around $1.4 billion. The interactive unit subsequently filed a lawsuit against Acclaim Entertainment in 2004. Also that year upon their 18th birthday, the Olsens took control of the Dualstar studio.

In 2006, Dualstar partnered with Dylan and Cole Sprouse, the twin siblings from Disney's The Suite Life of Zack & Cody, to produce Code a magazine geared toward a young male demographic.

In April 2015, Mary-Kate and Ashley reached a deal with Viacom-owned Nickelodeon to license the entire library.

Operations
On May 7, 2004, the company released New York Minute, the Olsen twins' last and only theatrical film since 1995's It Takes Two. The film did not do well at the box office, and suffered negative critical reception.  Since then, Dualstar and the Olsens have neither produced nor starred in another film.

Productions

Feature films
 To Grandmother's House We Go (1992)
 Double, Double, Toil and Trouble (1993)
 How the West Was Fun (1994)
 It Takes Two (1995)
 Billboard Dad (1998)
 Passport to Paris (1999)
 Switching Goals (1999)
 Our Lips Are Sealed (2000)
 Winning London (2001)
 Holiday in the Sun (2001)
 Getting There (2002)
 When in Rome (2002)
 The Challenge (2003)
 New York Minute (2004)

Musical video series
 The Adventures of Mary-Kate & Ashley series
 You're Invited to Mary-Kate & Ashley's series

Television series
 Two of a Kind (1998-1999)
 So Little Time (2001-2002)
 Mary-Kate and Ashley in Action! (2001-2002)

Legal issue
A class action lawsuit against Dualstar alleges that the Entertainment Group failed to pay interns for menial tasks. The suit, brought forth by forty past and current interns, argues that the interns should have been paid minimum wage because they were doing similar jobs as their paid colleagues, without receiving academic or vocational credit.

Dualstar responded, "As an initial matter, Dualstar is an organization that is committed to treating all individuals fairly and in accordance with all applicable laws. The allegations in the complaint filed against Dualstar are groundless, and Dualstar will vigorously defend itself against plaintiff's claims in court, not before the media. Dualstar is confident that once the true facts of this case are revealed, the lawsuit will be dismissed in its entirety."  The lawsuit was settled out of court in March 2017 for $140,000.

References

Film production companies of the United States
Mass media companies established in 1993
Companies based in New York City
Mary-Kate and Ashley Olsen